Ian Bird is a game programmer and game designer.  Along with other game credits, Bird wrote the computer games Millennium 2.2 and Deuteros.

Games
Theatre Europe (1985)
Millennium 2.2 (1989)
Deuteros: The Next Millennium (1991)
Campaign II (1993)
Millennia: Altered Destinies (1995)
WarGames (1998)
Chicken Run (2000)
The Mummy Returns (2001)
Pac-Man World 3 (2003)

References

External links
https://paleotronic.com/2019/04/30/surviving-on-the-moon-in-millennium-2-2/
https://www.dixiak.com/deuteros/

Year of birth missing (living people)
Living people
Video game programmers
British computer programmers
British video game designers